The 1969 Currie Cup was the 31st edition of the Currie Cup, the premier annual domestic rugby union competition in South Africa.

Results

Semi-final

Final

See also

 Currie Cup

References

1969
1969 in South African rugby union
Currie